Islamabad Electric Supply Company (IESCO) is an electric utility company in Islamabad, incorporated in 1998.

History
Islamabad Electric Supply Company was founded as Rawalpindi Electric Power Company (REPCO) in 1923 during British India-era. In 1972, the company was nationalized and subsequently was taken over by the Government of Pakistan. It was publicly listed on Karachi Stock Exchange until 1985 when it was de-listed from the exchange.

IESCO was formed in 1998 to take over the assets, functions and responsibilities of the erstwhile Islamabad Area Electricity Board, which was then a division of WAPDA.

IESCO's core function is to supply, distribute and sell electricity in the area from Attock to Jhelum, and from the river Indus to River Neelum in Kashmir. It serves 2.8 million consumers directly, but touches the lives of more than 25 million people living in the 6 districts it services.

References

External links
 IESCO
 IESCO Bill Online

Distribution companies of Pakistan
Companies based in Islamabad
Energy companies established in 1998
Companies established in 1923
1920s establishments in British India